Aljaž Bedene was the defending champion but chose not to participate.

Kyle Edmund won the title, defeating Filip Krajinović 7–6(7–2), 6–0 in the final.

Seeds

Draw

Finals

Top half

Bottom half

References
Main Draw
Qualifying Draw

Garden Open - Singles